Charles Chapman (1806 – 10 September 1892) was an English amateur cricketer and a priest in Church of England

Chapman was admitted to Corpus Christi College, Cambridge, in 1825. An occasional wicket-keeper, he made six known appearances in first-class cricket from 1825 to 1831, playing for Cambridge University Cricket Club. He was president of the Cambridge Union in 1829 and graduated BA in 1830 as 24th Wrangler. He was ordained as a Church of England priest in 1832 and was a curate of St Peter Mancroft, Norwich, 1832–45 and rector of Acrise, Kent, 1846–71.

References

1806 births
1892 deaths
English cricketers of 1787 to 1825
English cricketers of 1826 to 1863
Cambridge University cricketers
People educated at Eton College
Alumni of Corpus Christi College, Cambridge
19th-century English Anglican priests
Presidents of the Cambridge Union
People from Folkestone and Hythe District